Hyneria is a genus of large prehistoric predatory lobe-finned fish which lived in freshwater during the Devonian period (Famennian).

Etymology
The genus name Hyneria is a reference to the village of Hyner, Pennsylvania, near where the first specimen was found. The species epiphet H. lindae is derived from the name of the wife of Keith Stewart Thomson, who described this fish.

Description
Hyneria was a large fish. The largest complete jaw reaches , but there is much larger fragment possibly from a jaw about twice that length, although that specimen may belong to a rhizodont instead. A second species, H. uldezinye, was once estimated at range between  before being described,. Its skull had heavy, ornamented dermal bones and its lower jaw was relatively long and shallow. Its body was covered by cycloid scales. It had large sensory canals to aid in detection of possible prey, as the freshwater environment it inhabited likely was murky and had low visibility. Adult individuals retained juvenile features (i.e. partially unossified skeletons), suggesting that they were likely neotenic.

Discovery

The original fossils came from two localities in Pennsylvania, United States, one found between the villages of North Bend and Hyner and another near Emporium. They consisted of a disarticulated partial skull and fragments of the shoulder girdle. The fossils were found in the Catskill Formation of the Red Hill Shale, dating to the upper Devonian. These were the only remains known until 1993 when a renewed collecting effort discovered abundant new material. Hyneria is considered the largest and most common lobe-finned fish found in the Red Hill Shale. In February 2023 a second species of Hyneria, H. udlezinye, was named from remains discovered in the Waterloo Farm lagerstätte. These remains include the skull and shoulder girdle.

References

External links
Hyneria at Devonian Times

Tristichopterids
Prehistoric lobe-finned fish genera
Devonian fish of North America
Late Devonian animals
Fossil taxa described in 1968
Famennian genera